James Joseph Riley (November 10, 1886 – March 25, 1949) was a Major League Baseball player. He played one game with the Boston Doves on August 2, 1910.  He would go to play in 1912 for the Traverse City Resorters of the Class D Michigan State League as part of a 16-year Minor League Baseball career with teams as high as Double-A including the Toledo Mud Hens, the Binghamton Bingoes, and the Syracuse Stars.

References

External links

Boston Doves players
Major League Baseball left fielders
Major League Baseball outfielders
1886 births
1949 deaths
Baseball players from Buffalo, New York
Newburgh Hill Climbers players
Wilmington Chicks players
Utica Utes players
Buffalo Bisons (NL) players
Traverse City Resorters players
Albany Babies players
Syracuse Stars (minor league baseball) players
Binghamton Bingoes players
Toronto Maple Leafs (International League) players